During the 2003–04 English football season, Ipswich Town competed in the Football League First Division.

Season summary
Ipswich Town, in their second consecutive season in English football's second tier, finished the campaign in fifth place. Having scored 84 goals, Town suffered from their poor defensive record: with 72 goals conceded, Town had the third worst defensive record in the whole division, and the worst of the top 18 teams. Town won the first leg of their play-off, against fourth-placed West Ham United, with a goal from teenage striker Darren Bent (who scored 15 goals in the league alone), but lost the second leg 2–0, condemning Town to another season in the new championship.

First-team squad
Squad at end of season

Left club during season

Reserve squad

Pre-season
Ipswich's pre-season preparations for the 2003–04 season included a pre-season tour of Scandinavia in July.

Legend

Competitions

Football League First Division

League table

Legend

Ipswich Town's score comes first

Matches

First Division play-offs

FA Cup

League Cup

Transfers

Transfers in

Loans in

Transfers out

Loans out

Squad statistics
All statistics updated as of end of season

Appearances and goals

|-
! colspan=14 style=background:#dcdcdc; text-align:center| Goalkeepers

|-
! colspan=14 style=background:#dcdcdc; text-align:center| Defenders

|-
! colspan=14 style=background:#dcdcdc; text-align:center| Midfielders

|-
! colspan=14 style=background:#dcdcdc; text-align:center| Forwards

|-
! colspan=14 style=background:#dcdcdc; text-align:center| Players transferred out during the season

Goalscorers

Clean sheets

Disciplinary record

Starting 11
Considering starts in all competitions

Awards

Player awards

References

Ipswich Town F.C. seasons
Ipswich Town